Namtok Chet Sao Noi National Park is a national park in Thailand, with a total area of 26,238 rai ~  covering Muak Lek district, Wang Muang district, Saraburi province and Pak Chong district, Nakhon Ratchasima province.

Geography and history
Namtok Chet Sao Noi or Chet Sao Noi waterfall (literally: "seven little girls waterfall") is a small and beautiful waterfall. The waterfall flows along a stream and has seven tiers (hence the name seven little girls), but there are many different stories about the waterfall names. The height of each tier is approx four m (13 ft), with spacious, shaded swimming areas available underneath.

It has been upgraded from the forest park to be the 129th national park of Thailand on 26 December 2016 and is the first site in the King Rama X's reign.

Sights
Namtok Chet Sao Noi
Muak Lek Creek 

Flora and fauna
Namtok Chet Sao Noi is covered in tropical rain forest, including such species as Pterocarpus macrocarpus, Sterculia foetida, Bombax ceiba, Garuga pinnata, Senna garrettiana, Senna garrettiana, Ficus carica, Holarrhena pubescens and Fernandoa adenophylla.

Animal species include serow, jackal, marten, small civet, porcupine, palm civet, hare, ground squirrel, striped squirrel, flying squirrel, mongoose, pangolin, black baza, palm swift, shrike, snail-eating turtle, house gecko, monitor lizard, water monitor, python, birdwing etc.

See also
List of national parks of Thailand
List of Protected Areas Regional Offices of Thailand

References

External links

National parks of Thailand
Tourist attractions in Saraburi province
Tourist attractions in Nakhon Ratchasima province
2016 establishments in Thailand
Protected areas established in 2016